The Empire Icon Award is an honorary Empire Award presented by the British film magazine Empire. The Empire Icon Award was first introduced at the 11th Empire Awards ceremony in 2006 with Brian Cox receiving the award. The award was absent from the 12th, 17th and 18th Empire Awards ceremonies. Mark Hamill is the most recent winner in this category.

Winners
In the list below, winners are listed first in boldface. The number of the ceremony (1st, 2nd, etc.) appears in parentheses after the awards year, linked to the article (if any) on that ceremony.

2000s

2010s

References

External links

Icon
Awards established in 2011
2011 establishments in England